Supertec was a brand of Formula One engines supplied by Dutch company Super Performance Competition Engineering BV, managed by Flavio Briatore and Bruno Michel. Supertec engines were updated 1997 Renault RS9 units, built by Mecachrome.

In May 1998 Super Performance Competition Engineering signed an exclusive distribution agreement with Mecachrome to begin in the 1999 season. The engines were purchased and rebadged as Supertec. Supertecs powered Williams, Benetton and BAR in 1999, and Benetton and Arrows in 2000. The Benetton team rebadged the engines as Playlife.

After the 2000 season, Supertec collapsed due to financial problems and Renault Sport F1 bought back Supertec's assets in 2001.

Complete Formula One World Championship results 

(key) (results in bold indicate pole position) (Races in italics indicate fastest lap)

References 

Formula One engine manufacturers
Engine manufacturers of the Netherlands